Lê Minh Hưng (born 11 December 1970) is a Vietnamese politician. He is currently the Chief of Office of the 12th Central Committee of the Communist Party of Vietnam. In 2016, after being appointed at the age of 46, he became the youngest Governor in the history of the State Bank of Vietnam, a position he held until 2020. He holds a master's degree in economics from Saitama University, Japan.

References

1970 births
Living people
Saitama University alumni
Governors of the State Bank of Vietnam
Members of the 13th Secretariat of the Communist Party of Vietnam
Members of the 12th Central Committee of the Communist Party of Vietnam
Members of the 13th Central Committee of the Communist Party of Vietnam